The Oligohymenophorea are a large class of ciliates. There is typically a ventral groove containing the mouth and distinct oral cilia, separate from those of the body.  These include a paroral membrane to the right of the mouth and membranelles, usually three in number, to its left.  The cytopharynx is inconspicuous and never forms the complex cyrtos found in similar classes.  Body cilia generally arise from monokinetids, with dikinetids occurring in limited distribution over part of the body.

Characteristics 
In most groups the body cilia are uniform and often dense, while the oral cilia are inconspicuous and sometimes reduced, but among the peritrichs almost the opposite is the case.  Members are widely distributed, and include many free-living (typically fresh-water, but many marine) and symbiotic forms.  Most are microphagous, grazing on smaller organisms swept into the mouth by the cilia, but various other feeding habits occur.  In one group, the astomes, the mouth and associated structures have been lost altogether.

The Oligohymenophorea were first proposed in 1974 as one of three classes of ciliates, together with the Polyhymenophorea or spirotrichs and the now abandoned Kinetofragmophora.  Since then the apostomes have been added, but otherwise its composition has remained relatively constant, with the main variations being the positions of the peniculids and plagiopylids.

List of orders 
According to the WoRMS : 
 subclass Apostomatia
 order Apostomatida
 order Astomatophorida
 order Pilisuctorida
 subclass Astomatia
 order Astomatida
 subclass Hymenostomatia
 order Ophryoglenida
 order Hymenostomatida
 order Tetrahymenida
 subclass Peniculia
 order Peniculida
 subclass Peritrichia
 order Mobilida
 order Sessilida
 subclass Scuticociliatia
 order Philasterida
 order Pleuronematida
 order Thigmotrichida

References 

 
Ciliate classes